Villa Maria College, Christchurch, New Zealand was opened on 18 February 1918 with 14 pupils. It was founded by the Sisters of Mercy and served as a parish school when boys were admitted in 1921. From 1941 the school reverted to being a girl's college. Villa Maria College is a day school but it also had boarders between 1935 and 1979. In 1981, the college was integrated into the New Zealand state school system under the Private Schools Conditional Integration Act 1975 but its proprietors remain the Sisters of Mercy (through the Sisters of Mercy Trust Board).

Houses
Villa Maria College has six houses:

McAuley (yellow)

Brodie (orange)

Claver (purple)

Grace (blue)

Ennis (green)

Mercy (red)

Honour
In the 2001 Birthday Honours, former principal Sister Pauline Margaret O'Regan was made a Distinguished Companion of the New Zealand Order of Merit (DCNZM). She had left the school and the convent in 1973 to work within Christchurch's poorer communities.

Notable alumnae

Ellen Halpenny (born 1990), netball player
Courtney McGregor (born 1998), representative female artistic gymnast
Grace Prendergast (born 1992), rower
Jan Tinetti (born 1968), cabinet member of the Labour Party

Notes

References

 Villa Maria College golden jubilee, 1918–1968 Christchurch, 1968.
 Mary Declan Burke RSM, Mercy through the years : the centennial history of the Sisters of Mercy, Christchurch Diocese, 1878–1978, Sisters of Mercy Trust Board, Christchurch, 1978. 
 Michael O'Meeghan S.M., Held firm by faith : a history of the Catholic Diocese of Christchurch, 1840–1987, Catholic Diocese of Christchurch, Christchurch, 1988.
 Villa Maria College, seventy-five years, 1918–1993, Villa Maria College, Christchurch, 1993.
 Michael King, God's farthest outpost : a history of Catholics in New Zealand, Viking, Auckland 1997.

Educational institutions established in 1918
Secondary schools in Christchurch
Girls' schools in New Zealand
Catholic secondary schools in Christchurch
Sisters of Mercy schools
1918 establishments in New Zealand